One Nation Under God is the fourth album by the solo artist B. E. Taylor. It was released in the US in 2004. The album has nine renditions of popular patriotic songs, and one new song, "I Say, We Say, United States".

Track listing
"Pledge of Allegiance" - 2:45
"This Land Is Your Land" - 4:38
"I Say, We Say, USA" - 3:12
"Star Spangled Banner" - 3:12
"Yankee Doodle Dandy/Stars and Stripes Forever/You're a Grand Old Flag" - 3:47
"My Country Tis of Thee" - 6:17
"America the Beautiful" - 4:03
"God Bless America" - 4:03

Personnel
B. E. Taylor - lead vocals, (all tracks except 5) background vocals (all tracks except 5 and 8), acoustic guitar (tracks 1, 3, 4, and 7), producer, arranger, mixer
Rick Witkowski - guitar and background vocals, (all tracks except 5 and 8), producer, arranger, mixer
Jeff Jimerson - lead vocals (tracks 1 and 7), background vocals (tracks 1, 3, 6 and 7)
Hermie Granati - lead and background vocals (tracks 1 and 7)
Carsetta Lyles - background vocals (tracks 1 and 6)
Yolanda Odom - background vocals (tracks 1 and 6)
Felita Iverson - background vocals (tracks 1 and 6)
Roger Hoard - guitar (tracks 2, 5, and 8) 
Jamie Peck - keyboards (all tracks except 5 and 8), arranger, mixer
Tom Bellin - bass guitar (tracks 1, 3, 4 and 7)
Jeff Garrison - bass guitar (tracks 1 and 6)
B.C. Taylor - drums (all tracks except 5 and 8)

External links

B. E. Taylor albums
2004 albums
Covers albums
Concept albums